Caroline Ryan (born 10 October 1979) is an Irish former rower, and racing cyclist. Ryan won the bronze medal in the women's points race at the 2012 UCI Track Cycling World Championships, Ireland's first medal at a senior track cycling world championship since Harry Reynolds took gold in 1896 and bronze in 1897. Ryan won the time trial at the Irish National Cycling Championships three times (2011, 2013 & 2014).

Major results
Source: 

2010
 1st Combes Conor Memorial
2011
 National Road Championships
1st  Time trial
3rd Road race
 National Track Championships
1st  500m time trial
1st  Individual pursuit
 1st Stage 5 Rás na mBan
 7th Team pursuit, UEC European Track Championships (with Ciara Horne & Sinéad Jennings)
 9th Individual pursuit, UCI Track Cycling World Championships
2012
 UCI Track Cycling World Championships
3rd  Points race
9th Individual pursuit
2013
 1st  Time trial, National Road Championships
 1st  Individual pursuit, National Track Championships
 1st Dunsany GP
 1st Sorrento CC I.T.T.
 2nd Individual pursuit, 3 Jours d'Aigle
 3rd  Individual pursuit, 2013–14 UCI Track Cycling World Cup, Aguascalientes
 3rd Individual pursuit, International Belgian Open
2014
 1st  Time trial, National Road Championships
 1st Omnium, Irish International Track GP
2015
 1st Individual pursuit, Irish International Track GP
 3rd Time trial, National Road Championships
 3rd Points race, Belgian Xmas Meetings

References

External links

1979 births
Living people
Irish female cyclists
Irish track cyclists
Garda Síochána officers
Cyclists at the 2015 European Games
European Games competitors for Ireland